OmDayal Group of Institutions is a private engineering and architecture college in Uluberia, Howrah, West Bengal, India, which offers undergraduate (B.Tech & B.Arch) four-year engineering degree as well as five-year architecture degree. In engineering, it offers courses in four disciplines. The college is accredited by NAAC and is approved by AICTE and COA, as well as affiliated to Maulana Abul Kalam Azad University of Technology (MAKAUT).

Departments
It was established in 2010 and offers admission to five branches of Engineering:
 Computer science and engineering 
 Mechanical engineering 
 Civil engineering 
 Electrical engineering

A department of Architecture was established in 2012.

See also

References

External links 
OmDayal Group of Institutions

Engineering colleges in West Bengal
Universities and colleges in Howrah district
Colleges affiliated to West Bengal University of Technology
Educational institutions established in 2001
2001 establishments in West Bengal